Ballincollig is a suburban town within the administrative area of Cork city in Ireland. It is located on the western side of Cork city, beside the River Lee on the R608 regional road. In 2016 it was the largest town in County Cork, at which time the Ballincollig Electoral Division had a population of 18,621 people. It is located beyond the green belt from the suburbs of Bishopstown and Wilton. Historically home to the Ballincollig Royal Gunpowder Mills which is now a Regional Park, the town has seen much growth in recent years as a satellite of Cork City. Ballincollig is within the Cork North-West Dáil constituency.

History

Originally known as Maghmakeer as early as the 14th century, the town eventually came to be known after the Coll (or Cole) family who built Ballincollig Castle during the reign of Edward III, before selling it to the Barrett family in either 1468 or 1469. The castle was taken from Andrew Barrett by rebels in 1641, but they were expelled by English Parliamentary forces under Murrough O'Brien, Earl Inchiquinn, in 1645. It was garrisoned for James II in 1689, during the Williamite war in Ireland, then remained unoccupied after his defeat, and fell into decay.

The Ballincollig Royal Gunpowder Mills were opened in 1794 by Charles Henry Leslie, a prominent Cork businessman. Eleven years later, the mills were bought by the British, who were preparing for war with Napoleon, and the barracks were built to protect the supply of gunpowder. It was one of the largest gunpowder mills in the British Isles. In 1837, the mill employed several hundred workers, and by 1880, Ballincollig was one of the largest industrial establishments in Cork, with the mill employing many men and boys from the area.

With the closure of the Gunpowder Mills in the early 1900s, Ballincollig became little more than a small village on the road from Cork city to the larger market town of Macroom. The 3rd Royal Munster Fusiliers (Reserve) Battalion were stationed there during the Great War. Other Regiments stationed in the Barracks before it was decommissioned were 1st Field Artillery Regiment and 8th Field Artillery Regiment (FCÁ). The recently decommissioned Murphy Barracks was a major source of employment. In the 1970s, Ballincollig developed as much more of a satellite town, with many housing developments constructed around the old village, and housing people who worked in Cork city or its suburbs. This expansion continued through the late 80s and 90s. Consequently, the town's population has risen dramatically, particularly with the westward expansion of the town and Ballincollig grew to be largest town in the county.

In 2019, as part of the boundary expansion of Cork City, Ballincollig was brought within the administrative area of Cork City Council.

Religion
Two Catholic churches are located in the town. The modern 'Church of Christ Our Light' (designed by a local architectural firm) is located on the west side of the town, while the old 'Church of St Mary and St John' is located near the centre of the town, on Station Road.

The Bible Baptist Church meets in the Westgate Foundation on the west end of town. The church is associated with the Cork Bible Institute and other Gospel ministries.

Other religious groups including Hindus, Sikhs, and Greek Orthodox also have services at various locations in Ballincollig.

Demographics 
As of the 2011 census, Ballincollig was 87% Catholic, 7% other religions, 5% no religion, with 1% not stated. Ethnically, the town is 83% white Irish, 10% other white, 3% black, 2% Asian, 1% other, and 1% not stated.

Amenities
The amenities located in Ballincollig include a library, a multiplex cinema, playgrounds, shopping centres and the Ballincollig Regional Park.

The site is approximately 2.4 kilometres in length and the River Lee runs the northern length of the site. The site contains a system of canals used during the manufacturing process connecting all the process areas in a single flat system without locks. The canals are fed from the River Lee at the western end of the site. The park contains soccer pitches, a rugby pitch, walkways, a skateboard facility, and free-to-use outdoor fitness equipment - the latter installed on the park's western end in November 2011. As a result of a 2012 development plan, which outlined the future of the Regional Park by the Recreation & Amenity section of the local authority, planning was approved for multi-use games areas and a children's playground. This work started  December 2014 and is now completed. An eighty plot allotment scheme was also identified within the development plan, and was opened in November 2013 at the Innishmore entrance to the Regional Park. A series of marked trails were laid-out in 2014, and consist of four looped walks, colour-coded according to length. The Military Trail begins at the Shopping Centre Square and continues to the Regional Park by a westerly route. Three other trails of varying lengths begin and end at the western end of the park at Inniscarra Bridge.

There is also another playground near the Lidl on the western side of the town.

Ballincollig is home to several crèches, five primary schools, and two secondary schools. The two secondary schools in Ballincollig are Coláiste Choilm and Ballincollig Community School. Ballincollig Community School is located in West Ballincollig and is next to the 'Church of Christ Our Light'. Coláiste Choilm is located in East Ballincollig and is near a doctor's practice and the town centre of Ballincollig. Two of the primary schools, Scoil Eoin and Scoil Mhuire, are located in the town centre near St Mary's and St John's church. Three of the primary schools, Scoil Barra, Gaelscoil Uí Ríordáin and Gaelscoil an Chaisleáin are located outside the centre. Several of the area's schools are Gaelscoileanna (Irish-speaking schools), providing for a large number of pupils who learn through the Irish language in the area.

There are a number of shops along the main street, as well as a shopping center, Tesco and two Circle K refueling locations. In addition to restaurants and cafés, there are many take-away restaurants including traditional "chip shops", Chinese, Indian, halal, and others.

Places of interest
The Ballincollig Royal Gunpowder Mills is located on the north side of the town next to the River Lee. Some buildings in the Gunpowder Mills are now in disrepair but the area is still open to walkers in the Regional Park. The park is popular with locals and features a playground, skate-park, fairy-walk and many walking trails. The park has been extended westward in recent years to the River Lee Walk at the Fionn Laoi housing estate.

The grave of Rory Gallagher is located at St Oliver's Cemetery just outside Ballincollig. His headstone is a replica of an award he received in 1972 for International Guitarist of The Year.

The Coolroe Lime Kiln is an example of the historic quarrying in the Coolroe area of the town.

Shops
Large retailers in Ballincollig include Dunnes Stores, Lidl, Maxol, Tesco, two Aldi and two Supervalu outlets. Castle West Shopping Centre has a number of smaller outlets such as Specsavers. A weekly farmers market is also held at the shopping centre.

Transport & communications

History

The Cork to Macroom rail line served Station House (at the south end of Station Road).

Ballincollig railway station was opened on 12 May 1866, closed to passenger traffic on 1 July 1935, closed to goods traffic on 10 March 1947 and finally closed altogether on 1 December 1953.

Public transport

Ballincollig is served by a number of Bus Éireann bus routes. These include route 220 (to Carrigaline, via UCC, Cork City Centre, and Douglas), route 220X, (similar route via the Lee Fields rather than Bishopstown), and route 233 (Cork City Centre to Macroom via Ballincollig).

A number of proposals, such as the 'Project Ireland 2040' transport plan, include a potential feasibility study into a possible suburban light rail project in the area connecting Ballincollig to Mahon point via UCC and Cork City Centre.

Road
Ballincollig was situated on the N22 from Cork to Tralee. A bypass around the town was opened in September 2004, which resulted in reduced journey times from Cork to Killarney on the N22 and reduced traffic volumes through the town centre. The N40 starts on the eastern side of the town that continues as the Cork southern bypass. The N40 and N22 both share exit 1.

The former alignment of the N22 is now the R608 regional road which goes through the town centre.

Air
The nearest airport is Cork Airport which is about 14 km away.

Clubs and sport
Notable sports clubs in the town include: Ballincollig GAA Club and Ballincollig RFC. Mycro Sportsgear, which manufactures equipment for hurling, is based in Ballincollig.

Notable people
Samantha Barry, journalist, editor-in-chief of Glamour magazine
Horace de Vere Cole, prankster and organiser of the 1910 Dreadnought hoax
James Cronin, rugby player for Munster and Ireland
Colin Healy, association footballer and manager
Paddy Healy, All-Ireland winning hurler
Paddy Kelly, All-Ireland winning Gaelic footballer
Mick Mannock, recipient of the Victoria Cross has connections to Ballincollig
John Miskella, All-Ireland winning Gaelic footballer
Sanita Pušpure, world rowing champion

See also

 Metropolitan Cork
 List of towns and villages in Ireland

References

Towns and villages in County Cork
Geography of Cork (city)